Fiedler is a German word for "fiddler", and is a German and Ashkenazi Jewish surname. Notable people with the surname include:

Adolf Gottlieb Fiedler (1771–1850), German entrepreneur in Saxony and Poland
Arkady Fiedler (1894–1985), Polish writer
Arthur Fiedler (1894–1979), American conductor
Bernhard Fiedler (1816–1904), German painter
Bernold Fiedler (born 1956), German mathematician
Bobbi Fiedler (born 1937), American politician
Christian Fiedler (born 1975), former German football goalkeeper
Edgar Fiedler (1929–2003), American economist
Ellen Fiedler (born 1958), German athlete
François Fiedler (1921–2001), Abstract Expressionist Painter
Franz Fiedler (1885–1956), Austrian photographer
Fred Fiedler ( 1922 –2017), industrial and organizational psychologist
Fiedler contingency model, a leadership theory developed by Fred Fiedler
Fritz Fiedler (1899–1972), German automobile engineer
Hermann Georg Fiedler (1862–1945), German scholar
Jay Fiedler (born 1971), American football quarterback
Jens Fiedler (canoeist), East German sprint canoeist
Jens Fiedler (cyclist), German cyclist
John Fiedler (1925–2005), American actor
Joshua Fiedler (born 1978), American musician
Leslie Fiedler (1917–2003), American literary critic
Margaret Fiedler, London-based American musician
Max Fiedler (1859–1939), German conductor and composer
Miroslav Fiedler (1926–2015), Czech mathematician
Richard Fiedler (1908–1974), German SS-Brigadeführer
Richard Fiedler, German scientist and engineer who invented the flame thrower
Sebastian Fiedler (born 1973), German police investigator and politician

See also
Fiddler (disambiguation)

German-language surnames
Jewish surnames